Heti Válasz is a conservative online publication in Hungary.

History and profile
Heti Válasz was established in 2001. It is published weekly on Thursdays and is headquartered in Budapest. The magazine covers news on politics, economy and culture, and has a conservative stance. Since its inception the magazine has had different owners. In 2010 the owners was a joint venture which is established by a Hungarian media entrepreneur and politician, Tamás Fellegi, and a Danish venture capital firm, DEFAP.

Heti Válasz has a conservative stance. The editor-in-chief of the weekly, Gábor Borokai was the previous press spokesperson for Fidesz leader Viktor Orbán between 1998-2002.

In the fourth quarter of 2009 Heti Válasz had a circulation of 32,217 copies. As of 2010 its circulation was 20,000 copies.

The last printed edition was published on 3 August 2018, leaving only the online edition.

References

External links

2001 establishments in Hungary
2018 disestablishments in Hungary
Conservatism in Hungary
Conservative magazines
Defunct magazines published in Hungary
Hungarian-language magazines
Magazines established in 2001
Magazines disestablished in 2018
Magazines published in Budapest
News magazines published in Hungary
Online magazines with defunct print editions
Weekly magazines published in Hungary